Álvaro Luis Salazar Bravo (born 24 March 1993) is a Chilean footballer that currently plays for Primera División club Audax Italiano as a goalkeeper.

Club career
He debuted in a 5–1 home win over Audax Italiano in 2012.

International career
He was in the Chile U20 squad for the 2013 FIFA U-20 World Cup, but he didn't make any appearance at the tournament. After, he was in the Chile squad for the 2014 Toulon Tournament which included U21 players, making two appearances.

Honours

Club
Colo-Colo
Primera División (2): 2014 Clausura, 2017 Transición
Copa Chile: 2016
Supercopa de Chile: 2017

References

External links
 
 Salazar at Football-Lineups
 

1993 births
Living people
Chilean footballers
Colo-Colo footballers
Colo-Colo B footballers
A.C. Barnechea footballers
Universidad de Concepción footballers
Unión Española footballers
Audax Italiano footballers
Chilean Primera División players
Segunda División Profesional de Chile players
Chile under-20 international footballers
Association football goalkeepers
People from Linares